The year 2009 was the first year in the history of BRACE, a mixed martial arts promotion based in Australia. In 2009 BRACE held 2 events.

Events list

BRACE 2

BRACE 2 was an event held on August 15, 2009, at Broncos Leagues in Brisbane, Australia

Results

BRACE 1

BRACE 1 was an event held on March 27, 2009, at Broncos Leagues in Brisbane, Australia

Results

References 

2009 in mixed martial arts
2009 in Australian sport
BRACE (mixed martial arts) events